The Last Blow (French: Le dernier choc) is a 1932 French drama film directed by Jacques de Baroncelli and starring Jean Murat, Danièle Parola and Robert Ancelin. A separate Spanish-language version Fog was also made.

Cast
 Jean Murat as Captain Colbec  
 Danièle Parola as Marie  
 Robert Ancelin as Lucien  
 Nicolas Redelsperger as Guénot  
 Vanah Yami as Arlette  
 Henry Trévoux as Frémiet 
 Raymond Narlay as Ménard  
 Alexandre Arnaudy as Vachot

References

Bibliography 
 Crisp, Colin. Genre, Myth and Convention in the French Cinema, 1929-1939. Indiana University Press, 2002.

External links 
 

1932 films
1932 drama films
French drama films
1930s French-language films
Films directed by Jacques de Baroncelli
Films with screenplays by Henri-Georges Clouzot
French black-and-white films
1930s French films